World Karate Championship  may refer to:

 International Karate, a video game
 Karate World Championships, a sports event